Warwick Smith may refer to the following people:
Warwick Smith (curler) (born 1971),  Scottish curler
Warwick Smith (politician) (born 1954), Australian politician
George Warwick Smith (1916–1999), Australian public servant
John Warwick Smith (1749–1831), British watercolour landscape painter and illustrator
Francis Smith of Warwick (1672–1738), English master-builder and architect